Rolf Lislevand (30 December 1961 in Oslo, Norway), is a Norwegian performer of Early music specialising on lute, vihuela, baroque guitar and theorbo.

Biography 
From 1980 to 1984, Lislevand studied classical guitar at the Norwegian Academy of Music. In 1984 he entered the Schola Cantorum Basiliensis in Switzerland, under the tutelage of lutenists Hopkinson Smith and Eugen Dombois up to 1987 when he moved to Italy. From 1990 he was a teacher at the conservatory in Toulouse, France, from 1993 professor at the Music Academy in the German town of Trossingen.

Since his first album as main artist with works from the "Libro Quarto d'intvolatura di Chitarrone" by composer Hieronymus Kapsberger, he had gained various awards: Diapason d’Or,  Choc du Monde de la Musique, 10 de Répertoire, etc.

In 1991 he played as part of the sound-track to the French film Tous les Matins du Monde together with the viol player Jordi Savall, with whom he has had an extensive collaboration.

Lislevand's son André Lislevand plays the viola da gamba.

Honors
 1994: The French Diapason d'Or de l'Année 1994
 1994: Best Record of Music before 1650 / Cannes classical award  
 1995: Critic's choice at Gramophone
 2001: Spellemannprisen in the category Classical music for the album Alfabeto
 2004: Kritikerprisen, Norwegian Critics Award
 2015: Spellemannprisen in the category Classical music for the album Scaramanzia

Discography (in selection)

Solo albums 
1993: Johannes Hieronymus Kapsberger - Libro Quarto D'Intavolatura Di Chitarone (Astrée Auvidis)
1996: Antonio Vivaldi - L'Oeuvre Complet Pour Luth - The Complete Works For Lute (Astrée Auvidis)
1997: Gaspar Sanz / Antonio de Santa Cruz - Encuentro (Astrée Naïve)
2000: Santiago de Murcia Codex (Astrée Auvidis), with Ensemble Kapsberger
2000: Johann Sebastian Bach - Intavolatura (Astrée Naïve)	
2001: Giovanni Paolo Foscarini - Alphabeto (Astrée Naïve), with Ensemble Kapsberger
2003: La Belle Homicide(Astrée Naïve)
2005: Jul I Gammel Tid (Kirkelig Kulturverksted)
2006: Nuove Musiche (ECM New Series)
2006: Antonio Vivaldi - Musica Per Mandolino E Liuto (Naïve)
2009: Diminuito (ECM New Series, Universal Music Classical)
2015: Scaramanzia (Naïve)
2015: Tourdion (Inner Ear), with Bjergsted Jazz Ensemble
2016: La Mascarade (ECM New Series)

Collaborations 
1991: Claudio Monteverdi - Arie E Lamenti (Astrée Auvidis), with Montserrat Figueras, Ton Koopman, and Andrew Lawrence-King
1993: Tarquinio Merula - Arie E Lamenti (Astrée Auvidis), with Montserrat Figueras, Jean-Pierre Canihac, Ton Koopman, Andrew Lawrence-King, Lorenz Duftschmid, and Jordi Savall
1998: Corelli / Marais / Martin Y. Coll / Ortiz & Anónimos - La Folia (1490-1701) (Alia Vox), with Jordi Savall, Michael Behringer, Arianna Savall, Bruno Cocset, Pedro Estevan, and Adela González-Campa
2003: José Marín - Tonos Humanos (Alia Vox), with Montserrat Figueras, Arianna Savall, Pedro Estevan, Adela González-Camp
2003: Marin Marais - Pièces De Viole Du Second Livre, 1701 - Hommage À Mons.r De Lully Et Mons.r De Sainte Colombe (Alia Vox), with Jordi Savall, Pierre Hantaï, Xavier Diaz-Latorre, Philippe Pierlot 	
2003: Monsieur de Sainte Colombe le Fils / Marin Marais - Tonos Humanos (Alia Vox), with Jordi Savall, Pierre Hantaï, Xavier Díaz-Latorre, Philippe Pierlot, Jean-Pierre Marielle, and Le Parnasse De La Viole (3xCD)
2005: Luigi Boccherini - Fandango, Sinfonie & La Musica Notturna Di Madrid (Alia Vox), with Le Concert Des Nations, Jordi Savall, Bruno Cocset, Manfredo Kraemer, Pablo Valetti, and José De Udaeta 	
2005: Altre Follie (1500 - 1750) (Alia Vox), with Hespèrion XXI, Jordi Savall, Manfredo Kraemer, Michael Behringer, Mauro Lopes, and Arianna Savall
2009: Boccherini, Haydn - Boccherini: Fandango (Guitar Quintet No.4 In D / La Musica Notturna Di Madrid) - Haydn: String Quartets Opp. 3/5 & 74/3 (Sony Classical), with Carmina Quartet and Nina Corti

References

External links 
Rolf Lislevand takes the Salzburg Whitsun Festival by storm (Bachtrack.com)
Home - Rolf Lislevand Ensemble at ECM Records
Rolf Lislevand suona Corbetta at YouTube

Norwegian performers of early music
Lutenists
Vihuela players
Theorbists
Spellemannprisen winners
Schola Cantorum Basiliensis alumni
1961 births
Living people
20th-century Norwegian musicians
20th-century Norwegian male musicians
21st-century Norwegian musicians
21st-century Norwegian male musicians
Musicians from Oslo
Norwegian Academy of Music alumni